The Brea Mall is a shopping mall located in the Orange County city of Brea, California. Since 1998, the mall has been owned and operated by the Simon Property Group. It is home to four major department stores, 179 specialty shops and boutiques, and a food court. The anchors are Macy's, Macy's Men's & Home, JCPenney, and Nordstrom with one vacant anchor last occupied by Sears that has yet to be redeveloped into Life Time Fitness, retail, entertainment, and apartments.

History

The mall opened in 1977. Originally, the mall was anchored by Sears and May Company California. Later, The Broadway was added, and Nordstrom opened their second California store. J. W. Robinson's and a larger Nordstrom were then constructed along with a Y-shaped addition to the main mall in the early 1990s. In 1993, The May Department Stores Company merged J. W. Robinson's and May Company California to form Robinsons-May. As a result, the J. W. Robinson's store was sold to JCPenney (relocated from original location at Orangefair Marketplace in Fullerton), and the May Company California location was renamed and expanded. The Broadway was converted to Macy's after Federated Department Stores, Inc.'s purchase of The Broadway's parent company Carter Hawley Hale Stores in 1996. In 2006, due to the merger between Federated Department Stores and The May Department Stores Company, the Robinsons-May location was converted to a Macy's furniture store. In the 1970s and 1980s, the Brea Mall also had an ice skating rink that was later removed to expand the food court.

On January 4, 2018, Sears announced that its Brea store would be closing as part of a plan to close 103 stores nationwide. The store closed on April 8, 2018, making it the last original anchor store to close. On April 9, 2018, Simon announced plans to repurpose the Sears with a Life Time Fitness as well as new retail, entertainment, and apartments on three levels. The first phase is expected to open in the fall of 2020, with the remaining phases expected to open in 2021. It is one of the five malls owned by Simon that had Sears closed planned to be redeveloped. By June, Pink's Hot Dogs opened their own restaurant here.

Anchors
JCPenney
Macy's
Macy's Men's & Home
Nordstrom

References

External links
Brea Mall Official Site

Brea, California
Shopping malls in Orange County, California
Simon Property Group
Shopping malls established in 1977
1977 establishments in California